Sensitive New Age Killer is a 2001 Australian film directed by Mark Savage. The film was co-written by director Mark Savage and DOP David Richardson.

According to Ozmovies, the FFC provided money to give the film a theatrical release, but is not credited on all versions of the film. Where it is credited it is a tail credit that says it was ″marketed with the financial assistance of the Film Finance Corporation.″

References

External links

Sensitive New-Age Killer at Urban Cinefile
Sensitive New-Age Killer at Ozmovies

Australian action comedy films
Films scored by Ennio Morricone
2000s English-language films
Australian crime comedy films
2000s Australian films